Oumar Ballo (born 2 April 1991) is a Malian footballer.

Career

College and amateur
Ballo began his college soccer career at Community College of Baltimore County in 2011, before transferring to University of Maryland, Baltimore County in 2012.

Ballo also played in the Premier Development League for Baltimore Bohemians in 2012 and 2013, and Reading United A.C. in 2014.

Professional
On January 15, 2015, Ballo was selected in the second round (30th overall) in the 2015 MLS SuperDraft by Houston Dynamo and signed a professional contract with the club on February 23, 2015.

Ballo signed on loan with United Soccer League side Charleston Battery on March 24, 2015. However, Ballo was waived by Houston on April 23, 2015 without having made a first team appearance for either club. He trialled with D.C. United following his release, but wasn't signed by the Major League Soccer club.

On January 11, 2016, Ballo was signed by United Soccer League side Swope Park Rangers.

On November 30, 2017, Ballo was announced as one of Nashville SC's first signings ahead of their inaugural 2018 United Soccer League season. However, the team later announced that Ballo would not be joining the team due to visa issues.

Ballo spent 2018 with National Premier Soccer League side Northern Virginia United FC, making two regular season appearances and a single play-off appearance for the club.

Personal
Ballo moved to the United States from Mali when he was nine-years-old, settling with his father and step-mother in Baltimore, Maryland. His father's wife at the time, Audrey Haskins, was instrumental in guiding Oumar's education and introduction to soccer in America

References

External links
UMBC bio

1991 births
Living people
Malian footballers
Malian expatriate footballers
UMBC Retrievers men's soccer players
Baltimore Bohemians players
Houston Dynamo FC draft picks
Reading United A.C. players
Houston Dynamo FC players
Charleston Battery players
Sporting Kansas City II players
Association football defenders
Expatriate soccer players in the United States
National Premier Soccer League players
Soccer players from Baltimore
Sportspeople from Bamako
USL League Two players
USL Championship players
21st-century Malian people